The Huebra is a river in Spain, that flows from Escurial de la Sierra (in Salamanca province) to the river Duero.

See also 
 List of rivers of Spain

Rivers of Spain
Rivers of Castile and León
Tributaries of the Douro River